The 1989 Hopman Cup was the first edition to the Hopman Cup tennis event located at the Burswood Entertainment Complex in Perth, Western Australia. The event was held from 28 December 1988 through 1 January 1989. Miloslav Mečíř and Helena Suková of Czechoslovakia beat the Australian team of Hana Mandlíková and Pat Cash.

Teams

Seeds 
  – Helena Suková and 'Miloslav Mečíř (champions)  – Pat Cash and Hana Mandlíková (finalists)
  – Steffi Graf and Patrik Kühnen (semifinalists)
  – Catarina Lindqvist and Mikael Pernfors (semifinalists)

Unseeded 
  – Pascale Paradis and Thierry Tulasne (first round)
  – Sarah Loosemore and Jeremy Bates (first round)
  – Masako Yanagi and Shuzo Matsuoka (first round)
  – Karmen Škulj and Slobodan Živojinović (first round)

Draw

Quarterfinals

Czechoslovakia vs. Japan

Sweden vs. Yugoslavia

West Germany vs. France

Australia vs. Great Britain

Semifinals

Czechoslovakia vs. Sweden

Australia vs. Germany

Final

Czechoslovakia vs. Australia

External links 

1989
1989 in Australian tennis
1989 Hopman Cup
December 1988 sports events in Australia
January 1989 sports events in Australia